is a Japanese pop rock and kayōkyoku band. They won commercial success at the end of 1979 with their debut single "Daitokai", which sold 1.5 million copies, winning two popular song festivals, (18th Popcon and 10th World Popular Song Festival in Tokyo), others of their hits are "Shinkirō" in 1980 (750.000 copies sold), Shojo Kōkai (1980), Passion-Lady (1981), Ceccile (1982) and "Setouchi kōshinkyoku (IN THE MOOD)" (1984).

Internationally, Crystal King is best known for their composition and performance of the first two songs of the anime Fist of the North Star, "Ai o Torimodose!!" and Yuria ... Eien ni ". the original single of 1984 sold more than 500,000 copies, and adding the new versions that were released years later, sales already exceed 1 million copies sold.

Today, Monsieur Yoshizaki (leader and vocalist) has the rights of the band and he is still active under the name of "Crystal King" as a solo project.

History
Originally consisting of vocalists  and Masayuki Tanaka, guitarist , pianist , keyboardist , drummer , and bassist , the band broke up in 1995, Yoshisaki began performing as Crystal King as a solo project.

In 1986 Tanaka left Crystal King to start a solo career. But in June 1989 he lost his voice after being struck in the throat by a baseball and was never able to regain his original three-octave vocal range.

Albums

-1980.05.05 CRYSTAL KING

-1980.12.21 LOCUS

-1981.9.21 eleven carats

-1983.4.21 CITY ADVENTURE

-1985.6.21 MOON

-1987.7.25 1968・夏・東京

-1996.6.6 Bear Away

External links
Official website

Japanese rock music groups
Musical groups from Fukuoka Prefecture